"Praise the Lord (Da Shine)" is a song by American rapper ASAP Rocky, with production and featured vocals from English rapper Skepta, released as the second single from his third studio album Testing on June 26, 2018. It marks the third collaboration between both artists, following Skepta's appearance on Cozy Tapes Vol. 1: Friends and ASAP Rocky's appearance on Skepta's Vicious EP in 2017.

The song was successful in a number of countries, peaking at number 45 on the US Billboard Hot 100 and number 18 on the UK Official Singles Chart. It was later certified double platinum by the Recording Industry Association of America (RIAA) and platinum by the British Phonographic Industry (BPI).

Background 
ASAP Rocky and Skepta had collaborated twice prior to the release of Praise the Lord, working on ASAP Mob's Cozy Tapes Vol. 1: Friends in 2016 and Skepta's Vicious EP in 2017. In his Verified video with Genius, Rocky revealed the entirety of the song was written in London while both him and Skepta were heavily under the influence of LSD. The song features a sample from "Andean Stroll Panpipe 02" from Apple's GarageBand Jam Pack: World Music add-on for GarageBand.

Music video 
The music video was directed by Dexter Navy and released to ASAP Rocky's YouTube channel on June 5, 2018. It features a split screen showing scenes filmed in both New York and London, with cameo appearances from Tyler, the Creator, members of ASAP Mob and Skepta's younger brother Jme. As of March 28, 2022, it has been viewed over 400 million times.

Charts

Weekly charts

Year-end charts

Certifications

Durdenhauer Edit 
In 2022 French producer and DJ Durdenhauer made a remix of the song. Music video was published on November 18, 2022 on YouTube. The musical style of the edit is described as trance with hard house beats and lots of bass. Remixed song has over 1,000,000 views on YouTube.

References 

2018 singles
2018 songs
ASAP Rocky songs
Skepta songs
Song recordings produced by Skepta
Songs written by ASAP Rocky
Songs written by Skepta
Trap music songs